The 1909 U.S. Open was the fifteenth U.S. Open, held June 24–25 at Englewood Golf Club in Englewood, New Jersey, north of downtown New York City (Manhattan). George Sargent established a new U.S. Open scoring record to win his only major title, four strokes ahead of runner-up Tom McNamara.

In the opening round on Thursday morning, David Hunter made U.S. Open history as the first player to break 70, but he had some problems in the second round when he hit his ball into a brook and subsequently used four niblick shots in getting out.  After reaching the turn in 47 he made a nice recovery on the back nine and came home in 37 for 84 (he had another 84 in the third round and finished thirtieth). McNamara also had a sub-70 score with 69 in the second round and led by four strokes midway at 142.

McNamara carried a two-stroke lead over Sargent into the final round on Friday afternoon. Sargent birdied the final hole for 71 and his third consecutive round of 72 or better. McNamara struggled over the final 18 holes with 77 and finished four back of Sargent. Sargent's winning total of 290 broke the U.S. Open scoring record by five shots. Bob Peebles was well positioned after three rounds on 222 but struggled and fell back into the pack with a final round 78. 

John McDermott made his U.S. Open debut at age 17 and was 49th. He placed in the top-ten in each of the next five, with consecutive wins in 1911 and 1912, the first American-born champion. Four-time champion Willie Anderson tied for fourth in his penultimate U.S. Open. Horace Rawlins, the inaugural champion fourteen years earlier in 1895, made his last cut in the championship and finished sixtieth.

Past champions in the field 

Source:

Round summaries

First round
Thursday, June 24, 1909 (morning)

Source:

Second round
Thursday, June 24, 1909 (afternoon)

Source:

Third round
Friday, June 25, 1909 (morning)

Source:

Final round
Friday, June 25, 1909 (afternoon)

Source:

Amateurs: Travis (+12), Upton (+16), Douglas (+23), Tiffany (+30),Morgan (+36), Behr (+37), Kirkby (+40), Watson (+40)

References

External links
1909 U.S. Open
USGA Championship Database

U.S. Open (golf)
Golf in New Jersey
Englewood, New Jersey
U.S. Open (golf)
U.S. Open (golf)
U.S. Open
U.S. Open (golf)